La Jara may refer to:

 La Jara, Colorado, United States, a statutory town
 La Jara, New Mexico, United States, a census-designated place
 La Jara (comarca), Spain